

Company history 
In 2011, the Southport brand was acquired by the owners of Kenway Corporation and boat production was moved to Augusta, Maine. Upon beginning operation in Maine, the company was re-branded as Southport Boats. In 2014, the new ownership group announced the addition of a new hull, with two models sharing it- the 33FE and 33TE.

See also 
Center Console (boat)
Four-stroke engine

Sources

External links 
Manufacturer's Website.

American boat builders
Companies established in 2003